Elliott William Hardey (born 3 January 1932) was a Progressive Conservative party member of the House of Commons of Canada. He was a farmer by career.

Born in Chatham, Ontario, Hardey was first elected at Kent riding in the 1984 federal election, thus he served in the 33rd Canadian Parliament. Hardey left federal politics following the 1988 federal election in which he was defeated by Rex Crawford of the Liberal party.

References

External links
 

1932 births
Living people
Members of the House of Commons of Canada from Ontario
People from Chatham-Kent
Progressive Conservative Party of Canada MPs
Canadian farmers